Syria (SYR) competed at the 1955 Mediterranean Games in Barcelona, Spain. The medal tally was 1.

See also
 Syria at the 1963 Mediterranean Games

Nations at the 1955 Mediterranean Games
1955
Mediterranean Games